The OLPC XS (often spoken as "School Server") is a Linux-based OS (a Fedora Linux-based distribution) designed to be installed on generic low-to-midrange mildly ruggedized servers. Initial plans of building a custom server geared for the role have been postponed, OLPC however offers hardware recommendations for the system, and plans to support the XO laptops running as a server for very small schools.

OLPC XS can provide children's XO laptops and their Sugar Learning Platform with network connectivity for backups, anti-theft leases, web browsing, system, content updates, asynchronous collaboration tools such as Moodle, etc.

Projected specifications 

The (currently on hold) plans call for an energy-efficient design that does not require moving parts for basic functionality. It will be mildly ruggedized.

The XS Server's CPU is a PowerPC, the MPC7447A from Freescale, with AltiVec support. 

The system will boot from flash memory, which is far less likely to fail than a hard disk. Hard disks will be provided for storing a library of local content and for making backups of the children's data. The XS is intended to ship with one hard disk installed, and a second to serve as either a spare or for increased capacity. The second is not installed by default because this would consume extra power.

There will be three 802.11s wireless mesh connections. Each will be a USB device with a 3 meter (10 foot) cable, allowing good antenna placement (high, unobstructed) and good server placement (dry, secure).

References

External links 
 XS Homepage
 XS Server Specifications
 XS Community Edition created by OLPC volunteers starting in 2012 to be more modular and teacher-friendly, running on XO laptops in addition to traditional servers

One Laptop per Child
Linux distributions